In Islam, gambling ( or  qimâr)  is absolutely forbidden. 
Maisir is totally prohibited by Islamic law (shari'a) on the grounds that "the agreement between participants is based on immoral inducement provided by entirely wishful hopes in the participants' minds that they will gain by mere chance, with no consideration for the possibility of loss".

Definitions
Both qimar and maisir refer to games of chance, but qimar is a kind (or subset) of maisir. 
Author Muhammad Ayub defines maisir as "wishing something valuable with ease and without paying an equivalent compensation for it or without working for it, or without undertaking any liability against it by way of a game of chance", Another source, Faleel Jamaldeen, defines it as "the acquisition of wealth by chance (not by effort)". Ayub defines qimar as "also mean[ing] receipt of money, benefit or usufruct at the cost of others, having entitlement to that money or benefit by resorting to chance"; Jamaldeen as "any game of chance".

In scripture
It is stated in the Quran that games of chance, including maisir, are a "grave sin" and "abominations of Satan's handiwork". It is also mentioned in ahadith.

See also
 Khamr (Intoxicants)
 Sharia and securities trading

References

Islamic criminal jurisprudence
Islamic terminology
Gambling and society
Sin